XEP may refer to:

 XEP (software), an XML to PDF converter
 Isthmian script (ISO 639-3 code)
 XMPP Extension Protocol, in the XMPP Standards Foundation
 Chi Epsilon Pi, a US honor society
 XEP-AM, a radio station in Mexico
 Épernay - Plivot Airport (IATA code), in the List of airports by IATA code
 Athis Airfield (IATA code), a former airport
 Swiss Cosmetic Activen Brand, a cosmetic active from a Swiss based company.